Coney Island Light (also Nortons Point Light) is a lighthouse located in Sea Gate, on the west end of Coney Island, Brooklyn, in New York City, east of New York Harbor's main channel.

The lighthouse was first established in 1890.  The current tower was first lit in 1920 and is still operational.  It was automated in 1989.  The foundation material is steel pile and the lighthouse is made out of steel.  It is a skeletal white tower with black trim.  The original lens was a fourth order Fresnel lens put up in 1890. The most recent resident keeper was Frank Schubert (1915–2003). Schubert was the last civilian lighthouse keeper in the United States. He worked for the United States Coast Guard since 1939, serving at Coney Island since 1960.

The Long Island chapter of Sons of the American Revolution has published a history of the light.

References

External links

Coney Island Lighthouse web site

Coney Island Lighthouse Friends 
Coney Island July 2012 

Lighthouses completed in 1890
Lighthouses completed in 1920
Lighthouses in New York City
Coney Island
Sea Gate, Brooklyn
Transportation buildings and structures in Brooklyn
Government buildings in Brooklyn
1890 establishments in New York (state)